Abdul Rahim bin Ahmed (born 9 June 1933) is a Malaysian sprinter. He competed in the men's 400 metres at the 1956 Summer Olympics.

References

External links
 

1933 births
Living people
Athletes (track and field) at the 1956 Summer Olympics
Malaysian male sprinters
Olympic athletes of Malaya
Place of birth missing (living people)
Asian Games silver medalists for Malaysia
Asian Games bronze medalists for Malaysia
Asian Games medalists in athletics (track and field)
Athletes (track and field) at the 1958 British Empire and Commonwealth Games
Athletes (track and field) at the 1958 Asian Games
Athletes (track and field) at the 1962 Asian Games
Medalists at the 1958 Asian Games
Medalists at the 1962 Asian Games
Commonwealth Games competitors for Malaya